16th BSFC Awards
December 17, 1995

Best Film:
 Sense and Sensibility 
The 16th Boston Society of Film Critics Awards honored the best filmmaking of 1995. The awards were given on 17 December 1995

Winners
Best Film:
Sense and Sensibility
Best Actor:
 Nicolas Cage – Leaving Las Vegas
Best Actress:
 Nicole Kidman – To Die For
Best Supporting Actor:
 Kevin Spacey – The Usual Suspects
Best Supporting Actress:
 Joan Allen – Nixon
Best Director:
 Ang Lee – Sense and Sensibility
Best Screenplay:
Emma Thompson – Sense and Sensibility
Best Cinematography:
Alex Nepomniaschy – Safe
Best Documentary:
Crumb
Best Foreign-Language Film:
Mina Tannenbaum • Netherlands/France/Belgium

External links
Past Winners

References 
Hub critics pick `Sense and Sensibility' The Boston Globe
1995 Boston Society of Film Critics Awards Internet Movie Database

1995
1995 film awards
1995 awards in the United States
1995 in Boston
December 1995 events in the United States